Iani Chaos is a region of chaos terrain at the south end of the outflow channel Ares Vallis, of the Margaritifer Sinus quadrangle (MC-19) region of the planet Mars, centered at approximately ~342°E, 2°S. This is the source region of Ares Vallis. The chaotic terrain is widely believed to have formed via the removal of subsurface water or ice, resulting in flooding at the surface, and the formation of Ares Vallis. Within Iani Chaos, deposited stratigraphically above the chaotic terrain, are smooth, low-slope, intermediate-to-light-toned deposits that are rich in a hydrated mineral that is most likely gypsum as well as hematite.

Mars Science Laboratory
Several sites in the Margaritifer Sinus quadrangle have been proposed as areas to send NASA's next major Mars rover, the Mars Science Lab.  Among the top 33 landing sites was Iani Chaos.  A picture below shows a potential landing zone in Iani Chaos.  Deposits of hematite and gypsum have been found there.  Those minerals are usually formed in connection with water.

The aim of the Mars Science Laboratory is to search for signs of ancient life.  It is hoped that a later mission could then return samples from sites identified as probably containing remains of life.  To safely bring the craft down, a 12-mile-wide, smooth, flat circle is needed.  Geologists hope to examine places where water once ponded. They would like to examine sediment layers.

See also
 Aram Chaos
 Ares Vallis
 Chaos terrain
 Geology of Mars
 List of areas of chaos terrain on Mars
 Mars 
 Martian chaos terrain
 Outflow channels

References

External links 

Margaritifer Sinus quadrangle
Chaotic terrains on Mars